Hendrik Pienaar Hofmeyr (born 20 November 1957) is a South African composer. Born in Cape Town, he furthered his studies in Italy during 10 years of self-imposed exile as a conscientious objector. While there, he won the South African Opera Competition with The Fall of the House of Usher. He also received the annual Nederburg Prize for Opera for this work subsequent to its performance at the State Theatre in Pretoria in 1988. In the same year, he obtained first prize in an international competition in Italy with music for a short film by Wim Wenders. He returned to South Africa in 1992, and in 1997 won two major international composition competitions, the Queen Elisabeth Music Competition of Belgium (with 'Raptus' for violin and orchestra) and the first edition of the Dimitris Mitropoulos Competition in Athens (with 'Byzantium' for high voice and orchestra). His 'Incantesimo' for solo flute was selected to represent South Africa at the ISCM World Music Days in Croatia in 2005. In 2008 he was honoured with a Kanna award by the Kleinkaroo National Arts Festival. He is currently Professor and Head of Composition and Theory at the South African College of Music at the University of Cape Town, where he obtained a DMus in 1999.

Hofmeyr has completed more than a hundred commissioned works for, amongst others, the British duo Nettle&Markham, the Hogarth Quartet, the Vancouver Recital Society, the Latvian youth choir Kamēr, the South African Broadcasting Corporation, the South African Music Rights Organisation, the Foundation for the Creative Arts and the Cape Performing Arts Board. His oeuvre includes 6 operas, 2 ballets, 11 concertos and other orchestral works, 2 string quartets and other chamber and instrumental works, and many choral and solo vocal works.

Works

Stage
The Fall of the House of Usher (1-act chamber opera, libretto by the composer, after Edgar Allan Poe), lyric soprano, 1–2 tenors, bass-baritone, flute (+ piccolo, alto flute), oboe (+ English horn), clarinet (+ bass clarinet), bassoon, French horn, 2 percussion, harp, violin, viola, cello, double bass, 1987
Vala – A Metaphysical Ballet (scenario by the composer, after William Blake), large orchestra, 1989
The Land of Heart's Desire (1-act chamber opera, libretto by the composer, after William Butler Yeats), soprano leggero, lyric soprano, mezzo-soprano, tenor, baritone, bass, flute (+ piccolo, alto flute), oboe (+ English horn), clarinet (+ bass clarinet), bassoon, French horn, 2 percussion, harp, 2 violins, viola, cello, double bass, 1989 (rev. 2010)
Alice (3-act ballet, scenario by the composer, after Lewis Carroll), large orchestra, 1990–91 (a suite was arranged; also versions of Tango for 3 clarinets, 3 violins, cello, piano 4 hands and violin, viola, cello, piano; versions of some sections for 2 pianos)
Lumukanda (3-act opera, libretto by the composer, after Credo Mutwa), 4 sopranos, 3 mezzo-sopranos, alto, 3 tenors, baritone, 2 basses, mixed chorus, large orchestra, 1993–96
Die Laaste Aand (1-act chamber opera, libretto by the composer, after C.L. Leipoldt), lyric soprano, tenor, 2 baritones, 2 basses, flute, oboe (+ English horn), clarinet (+ bass clarinet), bassoon (+ contrabassoon), French horn, percussion, string quartet, double bass, 2001
Saartjie (1-act opera, libretto by the composer), soprano, chorus, flute (+ piccolo), oboe (+ English horn), clarinet (+ bass clarinet), bassoon (+ contrabassoon), French horn, trumpet, trombone, timpani, 2 percussion, strings (3.3.3.2.2), 2009
Saartjie Baartman (3-act opera, libretto by the composer), soprano, mezzo-soprano, 2 tenors, 2 baritones, bass, chorus, flute (+ piccolo), oboe (+ English horn), clarinet (+ bass clarinet), bassoon (+ contrabassoon),French horn, trumpet, trombone,  timpani, 2 percussion, harp, strings (3.3.3.2.2), 2019

Orchestral
Immagini da 'Il cielo sopra Berlino''', small orchestra (21 players), 1988Alice, large orchestra, 1996 (suite from ballet)Raptus, violin, orchestra, 1997Ingoma, 1998 Apocalypsis, large orchestra, 1998
Concerto per pianoforte e orchestra, 1999
Concerto per flauto e orchestra, 1999Simulacrum, large orchestra, 2000Umkulo Wemvula (Rainmusic), 2001
Concerto for Flute, Violin and String orchestra, 2002
Concerto for Two Pianos and Orchestra, 2004
Concerto for Cello and Orchestra, 2006Partita africana (comprising Preludio, Umsindo and Ingoma) 2007
Concerto for Alto Saxophone and Orchestra, 2010
Concerto for Baritone Saxophone and Orchestra, 2010Kasi – An Introduction to the Orchestra, 2011
Concerto for Clarinet and Orchestra, 2012
Concerto for Flute, Harp and String Orchestra, 2012 (also version for flute, harp and string quintet, 2012)
Concerto for Recorder, String Orchestra and Harpsichord, 2012
Concerto for Bassoon and Orchestra, 2014
Concerto for Recorder, Harpsichord and Orchestra, 2016
Concerto for Marimba and String Orchestra, 2016
Symphony II - The Elements, 2017Autumn Concerto for bassoon and orchestra, 2019

Chamber musicWonderland Suite, oboe, piano, 1977Cavatina, flute, piano, 1980Partita canonica, clarinet, 1983Die Lied van Juanita Perreira, cello, piano, 1985Cadenza, cello, 1994Incantesimo, flute, 1996 (also version for tenor recorder, 2002)Nelle mani d'Amduscias, violin, 1996Notturno elegiaco, harp, 1996 (also versions for flute, cello, piano, 1998; violin, cello, piano, 2003)Tango, 3 clarinets, 3 violins, cello, piano 4 hands, 1997 (version of section of Alice; also versions for violin, viola, cello, piano, 2003; for 6 cellos, 2003)
First String Quartet, 1998Ingoma for 4 recorders, 2000 (also versions for string quartet, 2010,; 4 flutes, 2014; 4 violas, 2014)Luamerava, violin, 2000Marimba, flute, 2000Scherzetto, alto recorder, 2000Luanaledi, alto recorder (+ tenor recorder), 2001Partita, viola, 2001Il poeta e l'usignolo, flute, guitar, 2004 (also version for flute, harp, 2005)Tango dell'amarezza, cello, double bass, 2004 (also versions for cello, piano, 2005; double bass, piano, 2005)Crucifixus, cello, organ, 2004Variations on a Chorale, flute, organ, 2005
Second String Quartet, 2006
Sonata for horn and piano, 2006
Sonata for flute and piano, 2006 (also version for violin, piano, 2008)Variations on an African Lullaby, violin (or flute or cello), 2007Lachrymae, guitar, 2007Rapsodia notturna, guitar, piano, 2007Endymion and the Moon, violin, harp, 2008
Trio, violin, cello, piano, 2008
Sonata I for violin and piano, 2008Il giardino delle Esperidi, 5 flutes, alto flute, bass flute, 2009		Lied van die Somerwind (Song of the Summer Wind), flute, violin, 2009	Canto notturno, clarinet piano, 2010Mabalêl – Fantasia on the poem by Eugène Marais, flute, piano, 2010
Trio, flute (or violin), clarinet (or viola or cello), piano, 2010 			Tango languido, lever harp, 2010			             	Umlolozelo, guitar,	2010Hartbreekrivier and Umsindo, vibraphone, marimba, 2010
Trio II, flute (violin), clarinet (viola/cello), piano, 2011Elegia, flute, harp, 2011
5 Chorale Preludes, organ, 2011Diablerie, viola, guitar, 2012
Concerto for Flute, Harp & String Quintet, 2012 
Sonata for Clarinet and Piano, 2013 
Sonata for Cello and Piano, 2013 Fiaba for 2 flutes and marimba, 2015 (also version for flute, violin and marimba, 2018)Ludzimu – Trio for violin, bassoon and piano, 2015 
Quintet for Clarinet and Strings, 2015 Mokete (Celebration) for 6 percussionists, 2015 
Three Pieces for Flute and Piano, 2016 
Sonata for Vibraphone and Marimba, 2016 
Sonata for Viola and Piano, 2017 
Divertimento for flute and string trio, 2017 
Concerto for Piano & 7 Instruments, 2017 
Sonata for Double Bass and Piano – Naka ya lethlaka, 2017 Necromancer for alto saxophone, piano, 2018 
Sonata for Trombone and Piano, 2018 
Sonata for Two Guitars, 2019

PianoNag, 1981–83Die Dans van die Reën, 1985
Four Pieces from Alice, 2 pianos, 1998 (version of music from the ballet)
Chaconne, 1999The Four-Note Waltz, 2 pianos, 2000
Toccata, 2001
Variations on a Mazurka of Chopin, 2002
Notturno, 2003
Sonata for Two Pianos, 2004March of the Lilliputians, 2006Partita africana (Preludio, Umsindo, River of Sorrow, Kalunga), 1999–2006
Preludio, 2011
Sonata, 2011
Variations on an African lullaby, 2011 Ballata africana, 2014 Homecoming, 2015 Fantasia sopra Senzeni na, 2016 Partita romantica (Prelude, Etude, Nocturne, Elegie), 2018

ChoralLiederwysgesange (text by Boerneef), mixed choir, piano, 1983Sound the Flute! (text by William Blake), mixed choir, piano, 1985–86Sweet was the Song (text by John Attey), mixed choir, 1986 (also version for children's/female chorus, 2001)Care-Charmer Sleep (text by Samuel Daniel), 5 mixed voices, 1987 Missa Sancti Ignatii de Loyola, soprano, chorus, 1988Requiem, soprano, alto, tenor, bass, mixed choir, 1975–93Kersliedjie (text by D. J. Opperman), mixed chorus, orchestra, 1995 (also versions for female/mixed chorus, piano, 2002; female chorus, 2003)Par les sentiers de lumière (text by Lamine Diakhaté), mixed choir, 1996Iubilate Deo, mixed choir, 1997Die Spokewals (text by Boerneef), mixed choir, 1998 (also version for 8 male voices, 2004)Eden (text by Ida Rousseau), equal voices, 1999Tu pauperum refugium (texts from the Bible, Latin liturgy), double treble choir, audience, 2000 (also version for double mixed choir, audience, 2001)Stabat Mater, mixed choir, 2000Pie Jesu, mixed choir, 2001A sexta autem hora (text from the Bible), mixed choir, 2001The Eccho (text by Richard Leigh), 6 mixed voices, 2001How sweet the moonlight (text by William Shakespeare), girls' voices (SSSSAAAA), 2001De profundis, male chorus, 2001Afrika (text by C. M. van den Heever), mixed choir, 2001My venster is 'n blanke vlak (text by N.P. Van Wyk Louw), soprano, mixed choir, 2002Nunc dimittis, mixed choir, 2002Hodie Christus natus est, equal voices, 2002 (also versions for treble choir, mixed choir, 2003; mixed choir, 2003)Ek wonder of jy soms (text by I.P. Du Plessis), mixed choir, 2002Super flumina Babylonis (text from Psalm 137), mixed choir, 2002Sedoosmusiek (text by Boerneef), mixed choir, 2003Die Here is my herder (text from Psalm 23 [Afrikaans translation]), mixed choir, 2003 The Healing Prayer (text by Elizabeth Peter-Ross), mixed chorus, audience, 14 strings, 2003 (also shorter version for mixed chorus, audience/congregation, organ, 2003)Sinfonia africana (texts by Eugène N. Marais, D. J. Opperman, C. M. van den Heever), soprano, mixed chorus, orchestra, 2003A Carol Cantata (texts from the carols "Hodie Christus natus est" and "I Sing of a Maiden", John Attey, D. J. Opperman [English translation]), soprano, mixed chorus, string orchestra, 2004Die Dans van die Reën (text by Eugène N. Marais), mixed choir, 2004Winternag (text by Eugène Marais), mixed choir, 2005Psalm 103 (text from Psalm 103 [Afrikaans translation]), mixed choir, 2006Lawaaimusiek (text by Boerneef), mixed choir, 2006By jonasdrif se sekelgat (text by Boerneef), mixed choir, 2006Batter my heart (text by John Donne), mixed choir, 2007The Birth of Orc (text from "The Four Zoas" by William Blake), mixed choir, 2007Mabalêl (text by Eugène Marais), children's or women's choir, 2007Saulus in Damascum (text from Acts of the Apostles), mixed choir, 2007Desert Sun (text by the composer, based on Bushman legends), mixed choir, 2007In lumine tuo (text from Latin liturgy), mixed choir, 2007Lied van !Kò (text by the composer, based on Bushman songs), mixed choir, 2007Rut (text from the Bible), treble choir, 2008Kaljanner kaljanner (text by George Weideman), treble choir, 2008		Genesis (text from the Bible), mixed choir, 2009		Horie petryse ennie fisane (text by Boerneef), children's or women's choir (SSSAAA), 2010		Psalm 148 (text from the Bible), mixed choir, 2010Kom ons prys die Heer se naam (text by the composer), SSA (or TBB), piano,	2010Gloria (text from Latin liturgy), mixed choir, 2010Wynverse (text by Hennie van Coller), SATB, pf, 2010 Kom ons prys die Heer se naam (text by the composer), SSA (or TBB), pf, 2010Jankemalanke Langklaasfranke (text by Boerneef), equal voices, 2011Juig, al wat leef  (text from Psalm 100 [Afrikaans translation]), equal voices, piano, 2011Bont konsertina laans die watervoor (text by Boerneef), mixed choir, 2011 (also version for mixed chorus, piano, 2012)A Song for St. Cecilia's Day (text by John Dryden), mixed choir, 2012Magnificat (text from Latin liturgy), mixed choir, 2012Bont konsertina laans die watervoor (text by Boerneef), SATB, pf, 2012 Die Lied van die Skepping (The Song of Creation) (text from the Bible), SATB, pf, 2012 
Psalm 42 (Afrikaans/English text from the Bible), SSA (or TBB), 2014 (also version for SATB, piano, 2016)Pater noster (text from the Bible), SSAATTBB, 2014Spring (text by William Blake) from Sound the Flute!, SATB, xyl, 2014 Laudate Dominum (text from Latin liturgy), SSAA (or TTBB), 2014 Ken jy die see (text by Uys Krige), SSAATTBB, 20154 Omnia tempus habent (text from the Bible), SSAATTBB,  2015 Of Darkness and the Heart (text by Fiona Zerbst), SA, pf, 2015 Nocturne (text by Elisabeth Eybers), SA (or TB), pf, 2015 Gedig vir Klein Estie (text by Wilhelm Knobel),  SA (or TB), pf, 2015By die dood van Motau (text by Wilhelm Knobel),  SA (or TB), pf, 2015Op slag gedood (text by Wilhelm Knobel), SSA (or TBB), pf, 2015Miserere super Senzeni na (text from Latin liturgy), SSATTB (with S solo), 2015 Koshuis-aandete (text by Lina Spies), 3 equal voices, pf, 2015 Tweespalt (text by Lina Spies), 2/3 equal voices, pf, 2015 Shall I compare thee to a Summer's day? (text by Shakespeare), SA (or TB), pf, 2015 I sing of a maiden (traditional), SSAA (or TTBB), pf duet (or pf), 2016 Agnus Dei super Bawo xa ndi lah le ke yo (text from Latin liturgy), SATB (with S and A solo), 2015 In tempore belli (text from the Bible), SATB (with S and A solo), 2016Koeloekoeloe (text by Boerneef), SATB, 2016 Die blye boodskap (text from the Bible), SATB, (with S solo), pf, 2016 The Bells (text by Edgar Allan Poe),  SATB, pf, 2017 Abraham and Isaac (text from the Bible), SATB, 2017 5 O come, o come, Emmanuel – carol fantasia (traditional), SATB, 2018 Salve, Regina (text from Latin liturgy), SSAATTBB, 2018 The wicked are like the troubled sea (text from the Bible), SATB, 2019 Weggaan en terugkoms (traditional), SSAA (or TTBB), 2019 Eva en die wind (text by Sheila Cussons), SSAA, 2019 You spotted snakes (text by Shakespeare), SSSAAA, 2019

VocalMusic, when soft voices die... (text by Percy Bysshe Shelley), high/medium voice, piano, 1983 (also version for high/medium voice, violin, viola, cello, 1994)Tre liriche in stilo antico (texts by Giacomo Leopardi, Torquato Tasso, Giuseppe Ungaretti), high voice, piano, 1982—84 (also version for high voice, violin, piano, 2012)Quiete and L'infinitofrom Tre liriche in stilo antico, versions for medium voice, cello, piano, 2000; voice, clarinet, piano, 2003)
Drie Gedigte van Elisabeth Eybers, mezzo-soprano/alto, piano, 1977–85
Twee Gedigte van Eugène Marais, high voice, piano, 1978–85Of Innocence and Experience (text by William Blake), high voice, piano, 1982–85
Tre canzoni (texts by Michelangelo Buonarroti, Giosuè Carducci, Enrico Panzacchi), high/medium voice, piano, 1983–85
Two Songs of Mervyn Peake, high/medium voice, piano, 1985The Death of Cleopatra (text by William Shakespeare), soprano, flute, alto flute, bass clarinet, French horn, harp, viola, double bass, vibraphone, 1986 (also version for soprano, clarinet, viola, piano, 2004; for soprano, string quartet, 2014)Alleenstryd/Outcast (text by S.V. Petersen), voice, piano, 1996; Fragment from 'Prometheus Unbound' (text by Percy Bysshe Shelley), high voice, flute, clarinet, French horn, harp/piano, violin, viola, cello, vibraphone, marimba, 1996Le bateau ivre (text by Arthur Rimbaud), medium/low voice, flute, French horn, harp, cello, vibraphone (+ tam-tam), 1996Byzantium (text by William Butler Yeats), soprano/mezzo-soprano/tenor, orchestra, 1997Of Darkness and the Heart (text by Fiona Zerbst), lyric soprano/mezzo-soprano, orchestra, 1999 (also versions for soprano, piano, 2002; soprano, string quartet, 2005)Hotel from Of darkness and the Heart(text by Fiona Zerbst), mezzo-soprano, viola, piano (also versions for soprano, trumpet, piano, 2011; soprano, flute, piano, 2015)Ballade van die Bloeddorstige Jagter/Ballad of the Blood-thirsty Hunter (text by G.A. Watermeyer), soprano, mezzo-soprano, tenor, baritone, bass, 24 strings, 2000Gebed om die Gebeente (text by D.J. Opperman), soprano/high mezzo-soprano, flute, cello, piano, 2000Due sonetti di Petrarca, high voice, soprano recorder/flute, cello, harpsichord/piano, 2000Psalm 23, soprano/mezzo-soprano/tenor, cello, 2000 (also choral version as Die Here is my herder)Ainsi qu'on oit le cerf bruire (text from Psalm 42 [translated by Louis Bourgeois]), high voice, flute, cello, piano, 2002 (also version with harpsichord instead of piano, 2004)Oda à la bella desnuda (text by Pablo Neruda), soprano/tenor, cello, 2002Die stil avontuur/The quiet adventure (song-cycle, text7 poems of Elisabeth Eybers [also version in English translation]), soprano, piano, 2003 (also version for mezzo-soprano, piano, 2004)Vier Gebede by Jaargetye in die Boland/Four Seasonal Prayers (text by N.P. Van Wyk Louw), voice, piano, 2004

ArrangementsUqongqot'hwane (Xhosa traditional), mixed chorus, soprano solo 1995 (also versions for SSSAA, soprano solo, 2017; for TTBB, tenor solo, 2017)Thula, babana (Xhosa traditional), children's/female chorus, 1999 (also version for mixed chorus, 2000)Ma, daar kom die jong soldaat (Afrikaans traditional), female chorus, 2001Dubula (Xhosa traditional), mixed chorus, 2003Three African Songs, contralto, chamber orchestra, 2005Al lê die berge nog so blou (Afrikaans traditional), mixed chorus, violin, 2009	Vaarwel my eie soetelief (Afrikaans traditional), mixed chorus, 2009 (also versions for SSA/TBB, piano, 2015; for SSAA/TTBB, 2016)Daar kom die Alibama (Afrikaans traditional), mixed chorus, 2009Thula, thu (Xhosa traditional), soprano, piano, 2011 (also version for soprano, marimba, 2014)
6 Chorales, SATB and (/or) organ, 2011–13  Senzeni na (traditional), SSATTB (with soprano solo), 2015 Weggaan en terugkoms (traditional), SSAA (or TTBB), 2019

DiscographyImmagini da 'Il cielo sopra Berlino'. Maurizio Dino Ciacci/Orchestra Musica '900 (Concorso Internazionale di Composizione Trento Cinema – La Colonna Sonora/Ricordi: SMRL 6396, 1988)Raptus. Andrew Haveron, violin; Marc Soustrot/Koninklijke Filharmonie van Vlaanderen (Cyprès: CYP 9306, 1997)Kalunga. Ju Jin, piano (BMG Records Africa: CDCLA [LF] 003, 2000)Chaconne. Grethe Nöthling, piano (Muzik Front, 2000)Die Spokewals; Uqongqot'hwane; Thula, babana. André van der Merwe/Pro Cantu (Pro Cantu, 2000)Incantesimo (original version). Merryl Neille, flute (University of Pretoria Music Department: CSO502, 2001)Pie Jesu. Leon Starker/SA College of Music Choir (Pasmae: CDPASMAE001, 2002)A sexta autem hora. University of Pretoria Camerata (Prospect Tonstudio: GEMA 00122, 2002)Ainsi qu'on oit le cerf bruire; Requiem (excerpts). Sanet Allen, Marianne Serfontein, sopranos; Suzanne Erasmus, alto; Stephen Carletti, tenor; Timothy Visser, bass; Marietjie Pauw, flute; Anmari van der Westhuizen, cello; Bennie van Eeden, piano (Sunset Recording Studios/Huguenot Foundation of South Africa, 2002)Concerto per flauto e orchestra; Concerto per pianoforte e orchestra; Ingoma (second orchestral version). Helen Vosloo, flute; François du Toit, piano; Emmanuel Siffert/National Symphony Orchestra of South Africa (Distell Foundation for the Performing Arts: CDX02/002, 2002)Tu pauperum refugium (original version). Hennie Loock/Tygerberg Children's Choir, Odawara Children's Choir (Japan), Moram Choir (Israel), Newfoundland Youth Symphony Choir Cape (Tygerberg Children's Choir, 2002)How sweet the moonlight. André van der Merwe/ Stellenberg Girls Choir (Stellenberg Girls Choir, 2002)Of Innocence and Experience (sections The sick rose and A cradle song); Twee Gedigte van Eugène Marais (section Winternag); Tre liriche in stilo antico (section L'infinito [version for voice, flute, piano]); Oda à la bella desnuda (section 2); Due sonetti di Petrarca (section Zefiro torna). Julia Bronkhorst, soprano; Paula van Delden, flute; Rebecca Smit, cello; Jacco Lamfers, piano (Q DISC: Q 97042, 2003)Sweet was the Song. Hennie Loock/Tygerberg Children's Choir (Tygerberg Children's Choir 2003)Hodie Christus natus est (original version). Hennie Loock/Tygerberg Children's Choir, 30th anniversary re-union choir (Tygerberg Children's Choir, 2005 )Sinfonia africana for soprano, choir and orchestra. Lesley Dunner/Sabina Mossolow, soprano, Stellenbosch University Choir, Cape Philharmonic Orchestra (Cape Philharmonic Orchestra, 2005)Uqongqot'hwane; Die Dans van die Reën. André van der Merwe/Stellenbosch University Choir (Stellenbosch University Choir, 2005)Die Dans van die Reën. Gérard'd du Toit /KwaZulu-Natal Youth Choir. (KwaZulu-Natal Youth Choir, 2005)Hodie Christus natus est (version for treble choir), Thula babana. André van der Merwe/Stellenberg Girls Choir (Stellenberg Girls Choir, 2005)Tango dal balletto Alice. I Grandi Violoncellisti (Cello Classics: CC1019, 2006)Sonata per corno e pianoforte. Shannon Armer, horn, Sandra Kettle, piano (South African Horn Society, 2006)Pie Jesu. Johann van der Sandt/ Singkronies Choir (Prospect Tonstudio: Gema 00174, 2006)Super flumina Babylonis. Johann van der Sandt/University of Pretoria Camerata (Prospect Tonstudio: Gema 00175, 2006)Of Innocence and experience; Tre liriche in stile antico; Tre canzoni; en skielik is dit aand; Die stil avontuur; Vier gebede by jaargetye in die Boland. Zanne Stapelberg, soprano, André Howard, baritone, Hendrik Hofmeyr, piano. (CDExpress, 2007)Notturno elegiaco. Trio Hemanay (Classic FM: HEM01, 2007)Die Dans van die Reën. Andrea Martinjak/Ljubljanski Madrigalisti (Sazas, 2007)Desert Sun. Maris Sirmais/Kamēr... (Kamēr..., 2008)Batter my Heart. Leon Starker/Pro cantu. (PC07, 2008)Mon amie, tu me suivras from Par les Sentiers de lumière, Pie Jesu. Arthur Sjögren/Pro Arte Singers (Candlewood Digital: PAS 3604)Winternag, Nog in my laaste woorde. Vanessa Tait-Jones, soprano, André Howard, baritone, Elna van der Merwe, piano (Stellenbosch: Stellenbosch University and SA Akademie vir Wetenskap en Kuns, 2010).Ainsi qu’on oit le cerf bruire. Melissa Manseau, soprano, Jennifer Yeaton-Paris, flute, Beth Pearson, cello, Paul Dykstra, piano (Navona Records: NV5827, 2010)Concerto per flauto, violino e orchestra d’archi. Raffaele Trevisani, flute, Piet Koornhof,  violin), Constantine Orbelian/Moscow Chamber Orchestra (Delos: DE 3399, 2010)It takes two .... Hemanay Trio (Johannesburg: HEM002, 2010)Kaljanner Kaljanner, Thula, babana. Hennie Loock/Tygerberg Children's Choir (Cape Town: 2011) The Healing Prayer. Arthur Sjögren/Pro Arte Singers, Michael Burnette, organ (Candlewood Digital: PAS 3801, 2011)Il poeta e l’usignolo. Liesl Stoltz (flute), Jacqueline Kerrod (harp). (Cape Town: 2011)Incantesimo. Marietjie Pauw (flute). (Stellenbosch, 2012)Canto notturno. Maria du Toit (clarinet), Nina Schumann (piano). (TwoPianists Records: TP1039145, 2012)A sexta autem hora. Stellenbosch University Choir, André van der Merwe (conductor). Headline - Stellenbosch University Choir in concert. Stellenbosch: 2012 Rapsodia notturna Goran Krivokapić (guitar), Corneli Smitp (piano). Chamber Music for Guitar and Piano. Germany: KSG Exaudio, 2013. Barcode: 4260108670277Song of the Summer Wind. Owen Brits (flute), Farida Bacharova (violin). Song of the Summer Wind – Choral music and new South African works from the Darling Music Experience. Darling: DME/CD/2013, 2013
String Quartet I, String Quartet II, Of Darkness and the Heart. Sabina Mossolow (soprano), Odeion String Quartet. Of Darkness and the Heart. Cape Town: SACM Productions, SACM20-0813, 2013. Barcode: 0700371586300Des ténèbres. Stellenbosch University Symphony Orchestra, Corvin Mattei (conductor). Hugenote Feeskonsert. Franschhoek: 2013Genesis, Lied van !Kho die Bloukraanvoël. Cape Town Youth Choir, Leon Starker (conductor). Chariots. Cape Town: 2014Die Spokewals. University of Pretoria Camerata, Michael Barrett (conductor). Phoenix. Pretoria: 2014
Sonata for Flute and Piano, Mabalêl Fantasy, Il poeta e l’usignolo, Incantesimo, Marimba. Liesl Stoltz (flute), Jose Dias (piano), Francois du Toit (piano), Jacqueline Kerrod (harp). Explorations – South African Flute Music. Cape Town: SACM Productions, 2015Preludio and Umsindo from Partita africana. Renée Reznek (piano). From my beloved country – New South African piano music. London: ASC Records, PFCD055, 0607128 998792, 2017Variazioni sopra una ninnananna africana. Lieva Starker (violin). Lieva Starker. Cape Town: 2017Hodie Christus natus est – Version for mixed choir. Stellenbosch University Choir, André van der Merwe (conductor). Heaven’s Flock''. Stellenbosch: 2019

References

https://hendrikhofmeyr.wixsite.com/

External links
Dictionary of African Composers

1957 births
21st-century classical composers
20th-century classical composers
South African composers
South African male composers
South African College of Music alumni
Academic staff of the University of Cape Town
Living people
South African conscientious objectors
Prize-winners of the Queen Elisabeth Competition
Male classical composers
20th-century male musicians
21st-century male musicians